The Municipal Council of Curepipe also known as Municipality is the local authority responsible for the administration of the town of Curepipe, Plaines Wilhems District, Mauritius. The current mayor is HanMargueritte.

External links

References 

Curepipe
Local government in Mauritius